John Brinkkotter is a former Australian rules footballer who played for the Sydney Swans in the Victorian Football League (VFL) between 1988-89. Brinkkotter was recruited from the Barooga Football Club and, making his debut in Round One of the 1988 VFL season against Footscray at Waverley Park, played five games in two seasons, kicking one goal.

References 

Living people
Sydney Swans players
1966 births
Australian rules footballers from New South Wales